Melissa Drexler (born 1978), who was nicknamed in the media as "The Prom Mom," is an American woman who, as a teenage high school student in 1997, delivered a baby in a restroom stall during her high school prom dance. The baby was later found dead in a trash bin, and Drexler pleaded guilty to aggravated manslaughter, having put the infant in the trash can and then returned to the dance. She was sentenced to 15 years' imprisonment. After serving a little over three years, she was released on parole.

Early life
Drexler was an only child from a middle-class Catholic family and lived in Forked River, New Jersey. She attended Lacey Township High School in the Lanoka Harbor section of Lacey Township, New Jersey and had plans for a career in the fashion industry.

Pregnancy
Drexler kept her pregnancy secret from the baby's father, her parents and friends. On June 6, 1997, Drexler gave birth in a bathroom stall at her senior prom, twenty minutes after complaining of stomach cramps in the car she had arrived in. She retrieved the baby from the toilet bowl, placed it in a plastic bag, and deposited it in a trash can. It is thought that she severed the umbilical cord on the serrated edge of a sanitary napkin dispenser and suffocated the child. According to the prosecutor, a friend asked if she was all right, and she replied "I'll be done pretty soon. Go tell the boys we'll be right out." She then returned to the dance floor, ate a salad, and danced with her boyfriend. When Drexler and her friends were asked by teachers about the blood in the bathroom, she replied that she was having a heavy menstrual period. The baby was discovered in a trash bin by a janitor, after a school nurse cleaned the bloody bathroom stall, emptied the trash can, and became suspicious of the weight of the trash bag.

Criminal proceedings
As part of a plea agreement, Drexler pleaded guilty to aggravated manslaughter on August 20, 1998. As of 2011 court transcripts had not been released. She was sentenced to 15 years in prison. On November 26, 2001, she was freed on parole after serving three years and one month.

See also

Infanticide
Neonaticide
Véronique Courjault

References

1978 births
American people convicted of manslaughter
Filicides in the United States
Infanticide
Living people
Lacey Township High School alumni
People from Lacey Township, New Jersey
Place of birth missing (living people)